The quadrangular space, also known as the quadrilateral space [of Velpeau] and the foramen humerotricipitale, is one of the three spaces in the axillary space. The other two spaces are: triangular space and triangular interval.

Structure 
The quadrangular space is one of the three spaces in the axillary space.

Boundaries
The quadrangular space is defined by:
 above/superior: teres minor muscle.
 below/inferior: teres major muscle.
 medially: long head of the triceps brachii muscle (lateral margin).
 laterally: surgical neck of the humerus.
 anteriorly: subscapularis muscle.

Contents
The quadrangular space transmits the axillary nerve, and the posterior humeral circumflex artery.

Clinical significance
The quadrangular space is a clinically important anatomic space in the arm as it provides the anterior regions of the axilla a passageway to the posterior regions.  In the quadrangular space, the axillary nerve and the posterior humeral circumflex artery can be compressed or damaged due to space-occupying lesions or disruption in the anatomy due to trauma. Symptoms include axillary nerve related weakness of the deltoid muscle in the case of any significant mass lesions in the quadrangular space.

History 
The quadrangular space is so named because the three skeletal muscles and one long bone that form its boundaries leave a space in the shape of a complete quadrangle.

The quadrangular space is also known as the quadrilateral space, the quadrilateral space of Velpeau, and the foramen humerotricipitale.

See also
 Quadrilateral space syndrome
 Triangular space
 Triangular interval

Additional images

References

External links
 
 Photo at umich.edu
 Diagram at wustl.edu
 Photo at tufts.edu
 Photo at ithaca.edu

Upper limb anatomy